Nuno Gonçalves (c. 1425 – c. 1491, fl. 1450–71) was a Portuguese artist whose work initiated the Portuguese Renaissance in painting. He was court painter for Afonso V of Portugal from 1450 to 1471, and in 1471 he was appointed the official painter for the city of Lisbon. His surviving masterpiece is the polyptych known as the Saint Vincent Panels.

Life 
The details of his life are almost completely unknown. As a painter, Nuno Gonçalves was active between 1450 and 1472. In 1450 he was appointed court painter by King Afonso V and in recognition of his contributions, he was knighted by Afonso in 1470. In 1471, Gonçalves was appointed the official painter for Lisbon. There is no information regarding his birth, family, or education.

Although his history is obscure now, Gonçalves was recognized in his time as an important and talented artist. Francisco de Holanda, a 16th-century artist and art historian, called Gonçalves one of the foremost painters of his era. Today, the only work that can be assigned to him with any confidence is the polyptych, Saint Vincent Panels, originally presented to the Cathedral of Lisbon by Afonso V to commemorate his victories in Morocco. A few other works have been tentatively attributed to Gonçalves based on similarities of style; and others, such as the Flagellation of Christ have been referred to historically but are now lost. In addition to painting, he probably drew the scenes for the Pastrana Tapestries.

There is no record of where Gonçalves trained as a painter but art historians offer various possible influences on his work. His style represents a break from earlier Portuguese art. He has been compared to early Florentine fresco painters or possibly the Dutch artist Jan van Eyck who worked in Portugal around 1428.

He is depicted, among several other historic figures, on the Padrão dos Descobrimentos, a monument to the Portuguese Age of Discovery in Belém, Lisbon.

Saint Vincent Panels 
The only reference that art historians can use to support his authorship of the Saint Vincent Panels is by Francisco de Holanda, in the 16th century. It mentions a great work of art made by him that is inferred to be the Panels. It is also speculated that the father of Hugo van der Goes collaborated in the painting of the panel but there is no concrete proof. Since their discovery in late 19th century there has been great dispute over the identity of the painter and the characters shown in the Panels. Even the claim that Prince Henry the Navigator appears in the third panel is still under debate. Nevertheless, the "Saint Vincent Panels" is seen as the highest peak of Portuguese antique art.

List of Works 

These paintings are the most usually attributed to the painter:
Saint Vincent Panels, c. 1470–1480, National Museum of Ancient Art, Lisbon
São Paulo, National Museum of Ancient Art, Lisbon
São Francisco, National Museum of Ancient Art, Lisbon
Saint Vincent Tied to a Column, National Museum of Ancient Art, Lisbon
São Teotónio, National Museum of Ancient Art, Lisbon
São Pedro, National Museum of Ancient Art, Lisbon

See also
Portuguese Renaissance

Notes

References
English

Portuguese
Figueiredo, José de, "O Pintor Nuno Gonçalves", Lisbon, J. Figueiredo, 1910, volume 1.
Pereira, Paulo, "História da Arte Portuguesa", Lisbon, Editorial Estampa / Círculo de Leitores, 1996, volume 1.

External links
Images at the//Web Gallery of Art
WebMuseum entry

 
15th-century Portuguese painters
Portuguese male painters
Painters at the Portuguese royal court
Renaissance painters
Year of birth unknown
Year of death unknown
15th-century Portuguese people
Year of birth uncertain
Catholic painters